Madhuca daemonica is a tree in the family Sapotaceae.

Description
The bark is reddish brown. Inflorescences bear up to seven translucent white flowers.

Distribution and habitat
Madhuca daemonica is endemic to Borneo. Its habitat is peat swamp, mixed dipterocarp and kerangas forests to  altitude.

Conservation
Madhuca daemonica has been assessed as endangered on the IUCN Red List. The species is threatened by logging and conversion of land for palm oil plantations.

References

daemonica
Endemic flora of Borneo
Trees of Borneo
Plants described in 1953